Cutty grass is a common name for several grasses with sharp leaves which may inflict cuts:

Austroderia

Cyperus ustulatus, native to New Zealand
Ficinia spiralis
Gahnia grandis (syn. Cladium psittacorum)
Gahnia setifola